Al-Suri may refer to:

Abū Isḥāq Ibrahīm ibn Mufarrij al-Ṣūrī, author of the Sīrat al-Iskandar
Mustafa Setmariam Nasar (born 1958), called Abu Musab al-Suri, member of al-Qaeda